Howell's forest shrew (Sylvisorex howelli) is a species of mammal in the family Soricidae. It is endemic to Tanzania.  Its natural habitat is subtropical or tropical moist montane forests.

References

Howell's forest shrew
Mammals of Tanzania
Endemic fauna of Tanzania
Taxonomy articles created by Polbot
Howell's forest shrew